Natalia Melnikova (Russian: Наталья Мельникова) is a Russian head coach in acrobatic gymnastics working in Moscow. Among her students are world champions in acrobatic gymnastics Tatiana Baranovskaya, Irina Borzova, and Tamara Turlacheva.

References

Russian gymnastics coaches
Living people
Year of birth missing (living people)